Hans Friedrich Karl Geitel (16 July 1855 in Braunschweig – 15 August 1923 in Wolfenbüttel) was a German physicist. He is credited with coining the phrase "atomic energy."

Biography
Through the relocation of his family, his father was a forester, Hans Geitel came to Blankenburg in 1861 and grew up in close proximity to Julius Elster. He attended school and high school together with Elster. A lifelong friendship developed between the two of them, their interest in science became a shared field of activity.

During their studies both spent two years in Heidelberg and Berlin. In 1879 Geitel got his teaching degree in Braunschweig and accepted a position as teacher at the then called Herzogliche Große Schule (translation: Ducal Great School) in Wolfenbüttel. In 1881 Geitel succeeded in getting Julius Elster to the school as well. There they intensified their joint researches. Karl Bergwitz (1875–1958), who continued their research, was one of their students there. In 1892 Geitel was elected a member of the German Academy of Sciences Leopoldina.

Publications
Geitel and Elster published works on meteorology, nuclear physics, and the photoelectric effects. Geitel recognized the law of radioactive decay in 1899 and coined the term atomic energy. In 1893 he invented the photocell.

Journals
 Elster, Julius and Geitel, Hans: Experiments on Hyperphosphorescenz. addenda to the annals of Physics and Chemistry, 21:455, 1897.
 Elster, Julius and Geitel, Hans: Via the influence of a magnetic field on the Becquerel rays caused by the conductivity of the air negotiations of the German Physical Society, 1:136-138 May, 1899.
 Elster, Julius and Geitel, Hans: About Ozone formation of glowing platinum surfaces and Electrical conductivity of ozonized by phosphorus air. Annals of Physics and Chemistry, 275:321-331, in 1890.
 Elster, Julius and Geitel, Hans: Experiments on Becquerel. Annals of Physics and Chemistry, 302:735-740, in 1898.

Awards
In 1899, Geitel was awarded an honorary doctorate at the University of Göttingen. In 1915 he was, along with Elster, awarded an honorary degree of the Braunschweig University of Technology.

See also
Photoelectric effect
Photomultiplier tube
Thermionic emission

References

Literature
 Rudolf G. A. Fricke: J. Elster & H. Geitel - Jugendfreunde, Gymnasiallehrer, Wissenschaftler aus Passion, Döring Druck, Brunswick, 1992.
 Horst-Rüdiger Jarck, Günter Scheel (Eds.): Braunschweigisches Biographisches Lexikon. 19. und 20. Jahrhundert (Brunswick Biographical Dictionary. 19th and 20th Century''), Hanover, 1996, pp. 203–204.
 Martin Weiser:  Geitel Hans. In: New German Biography (NDB). Volume 6, Duncker & Humblot, Berlin, 1964, p 164 (digitized).

1855 births
1923 deaths
20th-century German physicists
Scientists from Braunschweig
People from the Duchy of Brunswick
19th-century German physicists